

2019 Rolex Grand Slam of Show Jumping
 March 14 – 17: The Dutch Masters 2019 (GSSJ #1) in  's-Hertogenbosch
 Winner:  Henrik von Eckermann (with horse Toveks Mary Lou)
 July 12 – 21: CHIO Aachen 2019 (GSSJ #2) in  Aachen
 Winner:  Kent Farrington (with horse Gazelle)
 September 4 – 8: 2019 CSIO Spruce Meadows “Masters” (GSSJ #3) in  Calgary
 Winner:  Beezie Madden (with horse Darry Lou)
 December 12 – 15: The CHI Geneva, Switzerland, 2019 (GSSJ #4; final) in  Geneva

2019 Global Champions Tour
 February 28 – March 2: GCT #1 in  Doha Winner:  Julien Epaillard (with horse Usual Suspect d'Auge)
 April 11 – 13: GCT #2 in  Mexico City Winner:  Jérôme Guery (with horse Quel Homme de Hus)
 April 18 – 20: GCT #3 in  Miami Beach Winner:  Pieter Devos (with horse Claire Z)
 May 3 – 5: GCT #4 in  Shanghai Winner:  Dani G. Waldman (with horse Lizziemary)
 May 17 – 19: GCT #5 in  Madrid Winner:  Martin Fuchs (with horse Chaplin)
 May 29 – June 1: GCT #6 in  Hamburg Winner:  Daniel Deusser (with horse Jasmien V. Bisschop)
 June 6 – 8: GCT #7 in  Cannes Winner:  Niels Bruynseels (with horse Gancia de Muze)
 June 14 – 16: GCT #8 in  Stockholm Winner:  Peder Fredricson (with horse H&M All In)
 June 20 – 22: GCT #9 in  Cascais-Estoril Winner:  Martin Fuchs (with horse Chaplin)
 June 27 – 29: GCT #10 in  Winner:  Maikel van der Vleuten (with horse Beauville Z)
 July 5 – 7: GCT #11 in  Paris Winner:  Christian Ahlmann (with horse Take A Chance On Me Z)
 July 12 – 14: GCT #12 in  Chantilly Winner:  Darragh Kenny (with horse Balou du Reventon)
 July 26 – 28: GCT #13 in  Berlin Winner:  Dani G. Waldman (with horse Lizziemary)
 August 2 – 4: GCT #14 in  London Winner:  Ben Maher (with horse Explosion W)
 August 9 – 11: GCT #15 in  Valkenswaard Winner:  Maikel van der Vleuten (with horse Dana Blue)
 September 6 – 8: GCT #16 in  Rome Winner:  Ben Maher (with horse Explosion W)
 September 12 – 14: GCT #17 in  Ramatuelle-Saint-Tropez Winner:  Jessica Springsteen (with horse RMF Zecilie)
 September 27 – 29: GCT #18 in  New York City Winner:  Ben Maher (with horse Explosion W)
 November 21 – 24: GCT #19 (final) in  Prague

2018–19 FEI World Cup Jumping
 April 17, 2018 – November 18, 2018: 2018 FEI World Cup Jumping – South America South League
 Winner:  Luiz Felipe Pimenta Alves (with horse GB Celine)
 April 21, 2018 – December 1, 2018: 2018 FEI World Cup Jumping –  League
 Winner:  Shino Hirota (with horse Life Is Beautiful)
 April 26, 2018 – May 27, 2018: 2018 FEI World Cup Jumping – Central Asian League (incomplete)
 Winner:  Kamil Sabitov (with horse Quintendro)
 April 26, 2018 – October 28, 2018: 2018 FEI World Cup Jumping –  South African League
 Winner:  Marlene Sinclair (with horse Camaro)
 April 28, 2018 – October 7, 2018: 2018 FEI World Cup Jumping –  League
 Winner:  LIU Tongyan (with horses Ku Bu Qi & Yu Long Qi Ji)
 May 10, 2018 – March 10, 2019: 2018–19 FEI World Cup Jumping – Central European League
 North CEL winner:  Kullo Kender (with horse Artas)
 South CEL winner:  Andrea Herck (with three different horses)
 March 7 – 10: 2019 Central European League Final in  Warsaw
 Winner:  Wojciech Wojcianiec (with horse Naccord Melloni)
 Overall winner:  Jaroslaw Skrzyczynski
 June 20, 2018 – February 8, 2019: 2018–19 FEI World Cup Jumping – Caucasus-Caspian League
 Winner:  Masoud Mokarinezhad (with horse Confident To Fly SB)
 July 28, 2018 – February 3, 2019: 2018–19 FEI World Cup Jumping –  Australian League
 Winner:  Aaron Hadlow (with horse Vahlinvader)
 August 21, 2018 – March 10, 2019: 2018–19 FEI World Cup Jumping – North American League
 Eastern NAL winner:  Beezie Madden (with 4 different horses)
 Western NAL winner:  Richard Spooner (with horses Quirado RC & Quitana 11)
 August 30, 2018 – February 2, 2019: 2018–19 FEI World Cup Jumping –  Arab League
 Middle East Sub-League winner:  Ramzy Al-Duhami (with horses Ted & High Quality J)
 North African Sub-League winner:  Abdel Saïd (with horses Venise du Reverdy & Jumpy van de Hermitage)
 October 10, 2018 – February 10, 2019: 2018–19 FEI World Cup Jumping –  Western European League
 Winner:  Daniel Deusser (with three different horses)
 October 19, 2018 – December 16, 2018: 2018 FEI World Cup Jumping – South East Asian League
 Winner:  Siengsaw Lertratanachai (with horse Courville L)
 October 19, 2018 – January 13, 2019: 2018–19 FEI World Cup Jumping –  League
 Winner:  Tegan Fitzsimon (with horse Windermere Cappuccino)

2018–19 FEI World Cup Dressage
 March 22, 2018 – March 23, 2019: 2018–19 FEI World Cup Dressage –  Pacific League
 Werribee #1 winner:  Alexis Hellyer (with horse Bluefields Floreno)
 Boneo #1 winner:  Brett Parbery (with horse DP Weltmieser)
 Boneo #2 winner:  Matthew Dowsley (with horse AEA Prestige)
 Melbourne winner:  Suzanne Hearn (with horse Remmington)
 Boneo #3 winner:  Rozzie Ryan (with horse Jarrah R)
 Werribee #2 winner:  Katharine Farrell (with horse Luxor 118)
 April 25, 2018 – March 10, 2019: 2018–19 FEI World Cup Dressage – Central European League
 Note: There was a tie for first place in this overall event.
 Winner #1:  Regina Isachkina (with horses Sun of May Life & La Fleur)
 Winner #2:  Stanislav Cherednichenko (with horse Arums)
 April 26, 2018 – April 14, 2019: 2018–19 FEI World Cup Dressage – North American League
 Del Mar Fairgrounds winner:  Steffen Peters (with horse Suppenkasper)
 Saugerties #1 winner:  Laura Noyes Putnam (with horse Galveston) (default)
 Saugerties #2 winner:  Jane Karol (with horse Sunshine Tour) (default)
 Devon winner:  Jessica Jo Tate (with horse Faberge)
 Wellington #1 winner:  Laura Graves (with horse Verdades)
 Wellington #2 winner:  Laura Graves (with horse Verdades)
 Temecula #1 winner:  Nick Wagman (with horse Don John)
 Wellington #3 winner:  Kasey Perry-Glass (with horse Goerklintgaards Dublet)
 Wellington #4 winner:  Laura Graves (with horse Verdades)
 Temecula #2 winner:  Jennifer Schrader-Williams (with horse Millione) (default)
 Temecula #3 winner:  Steffen Peters (with horse Suppenkasper)
 October 17, 2018 – March 17, 2019: 2018–19 FEI World Cup Dressage –  Western European League
 Winner:  Helen Langehanenberg (with horse Damsey FRH)

2019 Show Jumping World Cup and Dressage World Cup Finals
 April 3 – 7: 2019 FEI World Cup Show Jumping and Dressage Finals in  Gothenburg
 Jumping winner:  Steve Guerdat (with horse Alamo)
 Dressage winner:  Isabell Werth (with horse Weihegold OLD)

2019 FEI Nations Cup Jumping
 February 13 – 17: NCJ #1 in  Wellington (Deeridge Farms)
 Individual winners: Three different riders and horses took first place here.
 Team winners:  (Fernando Martínez Sommer (with horse Cor Bakker), Eugenio Garza Perez (with horse Victer Finn DH Z), Juan Jose Zendejas Salgado (with horse Tino la Chapelle), & Manuel González Dufrane (with horse Hortensia van de Leeuwerk))
 February 20 – 23: NCJ #2 in  Abu Dhabi
 Individual winner:  Abdel Said (with horse Venise du Reverdy)
 Team winners:  (Mario Stevens (with horse Talisman de Mazure), Sven Schlüsselburg (with horse Bud Spencer 7), Miriam Schneider (with horse Fidelius G), & Philipp Weishaupt (with horse Catokia 2))
 May 2 – 5: NCJ #3 in  Xalapa (Coapexpan)
 Individual winner:  Lorenza O'Farrill (with horse Queens Darling)
 Team winners:  (Patricio Pasquel (with horse Babel), Manuel González Dufrane (with horse Hortensia van de Leeuwerk), Lorenza O'Farrill (with horse Queens Darling), & Salvador Oñate (with horse Big Red))
 May 16 – 19: NCJ #4 in  La Baule-Escoublac
 Individual winners: Five different riders and horses took first place here.
 Team winners:  (Niklaus Rutschi (with horse Cardano CH), Bryan Balsiger (with horse Clouzot de Lassus), Paul Estermann (with horse Lord Pepsi), & Steve Guerdat (with horse Albfuehren's Bianca))
 May 28 – June 2: NCJ #5 in  Langley
 Individual winners: Six different riders and horses took first place here.
 Team winners:  (Lisa Carlsen (with horse Parette), Nicole Walker (with horse Falco van Spieveld), Tiffany Foster (with horse Figor), & Mario Deslauriers (with horse Bardolina 2))
 May 30 – June 2: NCJ #6 in  St. Gallen
 Individual winners: Five different riders and horses took first place here.
 Team winners:  (Pénélope Leprevost (with horse Vancouver de Lanlore), Guillaume Foutrier (with horse Valdocco des Caps), Nicolas Delmotte (with horse Urvoso du Roch), & Kevin Staut (with horse Calevo 2))
 June 13 – 16: NCJ #7 in  Sopot
 Individual winners: Four different riders and horses took first place here.
 Team winners:  (Niels Bruynseels (with horse Delux van T & L), Gudrun Patteet (with horse Sea Coast Valdelamadre Clooney), Yves Vanderhasselt (with horse Jeunesse), & Pieter Devos (with horse Apart))
 June 20 – 23: NCJ #8 in  Geesteren
 Individual winner:  Felipe Amaral (with horse Germanico T)
 Team winners:  (Marlon Modolo Zanotelli (with horse Sirene de la Motte), Felipe Amaral (with horse Germanico T), Pedro Junqueira Muylaert (with horse C'est Dorijke), & Pedro Veniss (with horse Quabri de L'Isle))
 July 11 – 14: NCJ #9 in  Falsterbo
 Individual winners: Four different riders and horses took first place here.
 Team winners:  (Malin Baryard-Johnsson (with horse H&M Indiana), Fredrik Jonsson (with horse Cold Play), Stephanie Holmen (with horse Flip's Little Sparrow), & Peder Fredricson (with horse H&M All In))
 July 25 – 28: NCJ #10 in  Hickstead (West Sussex)
 Individual winners: Seven different riders and horses took first place here.
 Team winners:  (Fredrik Jonsson (with horse Cold Play), Angelie von Essen (with horse Luikan Q), Peder Fredricson (with horse Zacramento), & Rolf-Göran Bengtsson (with horse Oak Grove's Carlyle))
 August 7 – 11: NCJ #11 in  Dublin
 Individual winners: Three different riders and horses took first place here.
 Team winners:  (Ben Maher (with horse Concona), Scott Brash (with horse Hello Jefferson), Emily Moffitt (with horse Winning Good), & Holly Smith (with horse Hearts Destiny))
 October 3 – 6: Longines FEI Jumping Nations Cup Final in  Barcelona
 Individual winner:  Massimo Grossato (with horse Lazzaro delle Schiave)
 Team winners:  (Peter Moloney (with horse Chianti's Champion), Paul O'Shea (with horse Skara Glen's Machu Picchu), Darragh Kenny (with horse Balou du Reventon), & Cian O'Connor (with horse PSG Final))

2019 FEI Nations Cup Dressage
 March 12 – 17: NCD #1 in  Wellington
 Individual winner:  Shelly Francis (with horse Danilo)
 Team winners:  (Ashley Holzer (with horse Valentine), Jennifer Baumert (with horse Handsome), Charlotte Jorst (with horse Kastel's Nintendo), & Shelly Francis (with horse Danilo))
 May 16 – 19: NCD #2 in  Compiègne
 Individual winner:  Emmelie Scholtens (with horse Desperado)
 Team winners:  (Richard Davison (with horse Bubblingh), Charlotte Fry (with horse Dark Legend), Carl Hester (with horse Hawtins Delicato), & Gareth Hughes (with horse Classic Briolinca))
 May 23 – 26: NCD #3 in  Uggerhalne
 Individual winner:  Agnete Kirk Thinggaard (with horse Jojo AZ)
 Team winners:  (Agnete Kirk Thinggaard (with horse Jojo AZ), Daniel Bachmann Andersen (with horse Blue Hors Don Olymbrio), Cathrine Dufour (with horse Bohemian), & Carina Cassøe Krüth (with horse May-Day Graftebjerg))
 June 17 – 23: NCD #4 in  Geesteren
 Individual winner:  Edward Gal (with horse Glock's Zonik N.O.P.)
 Team winners:  (Edward Gal (with horse Glock's Zonik N.O.P.), Emmelie Scholtens (with horse Desperado), Anne Meulendijks (with horse MDH Avanti N.O.P., & Hans Peter Minderhoud (with horse Glock's Dream Boy N.O.P.))
 July 5 – 7: NCD #5 in  Järvenpää
 Individual winner:  Henri Ruoste (with horse Roble)
 Team winners:  (Gunilla Byström (with horse Vectra), Märit Olofsson Nääs (with horse Strolchi), Lena Wiman (with horse Donnerstein), & Tinne Vilhelmson-Silfvén (with horse Esperance))
 July 11 – 14: NCD #6 in  Falsterbo
 Individual winner:  Daniel Bachmann Andersen (with horse Blue Hors Zack)
 Team winners:  (Patrik Kittel (with horse Well Done de la Roche CMF), Juliette Ramel (with horse Wall Street JV), Malin Wahlkamp-Nilsson (with horse Eddieni), & Minna Telde (with horse Isac))
 July 17 – 21: NCD #7 in  Aachen
 Individual winner:  Isabell Werth (with horse Bella Rose 2)
 Team winners:  (Jessica von Bredow-Werndl (with horse TSF Dalera BB), Helen Langehanenberg (with horse Damsey FRH), Isabell Werth (with horse Bella Rose 2), & Dorothee Schneider (with horse Showtime FRH))
 July 25 – 28: NCD #8 (final) in  Hickstead (West Sussex)
 Individual winner:  Lara Butler (with horse Rubin Al-Asad)
 Team winners:  (Miguel Ralão Duarte (with horse Xenofonte d'Atela), Duarte Nogueira (with horse Beirao), Rodrigo Torres (with horse Fogoso), & João Miguel Torrao (with horse Equador))

2019 FEI Nations Cup Eventing
 May 23 – 26: NCE #1 in  Houghton Hall
 Individual winner:  Christoph Wahler (with horse Carjatan S)
 Team winners:  (Christoph Wahler (with horse Carjatan S), Jerome Robine (with horse Quaddeldou R Old), Ingrid Klimke (with horse Asha P), & Felix Etzel (with horse Bandit 436))
 June 5 – 9: NCE #2 in  Pratoni del Vivaro (Olympic Qualifier for 2020)
 Individual winner:  Niklas Lindbäck (with horse Focus Filiocus)
 Team winners:  (Tiziana Realini (with horse Toubleu de Rueire), Caroline Gerber (with horse Tresor de Chignan CH), & Patrizia Attinger (with horse Mooney Amach))
 June 26 – 30: NCE #3 in  Strzegom
 Individual winner:  Michael Jung (with horse Fischerchipmunk FRH)
 Team winners:  (Michael Jung (with horse Fischerchipmunk FRH), Andreas Dibowski (with horse FRH Corrida), Josefa Sommer (with horse Hamilton 24), & Miriam Engel (with horse Bonita Bella))
 July 24 – 28: NCE #4 in  Camphire Cappoquin
 Individual winner:  Sam Watson (with horse Imperial Sky)
 Team winners:  (Tim Price (with horse Bango), Mark Todd (with horse Leonidas II), & Jonelle Price (with horse Grappa Nera))
 August 7 – 11: NCE #5 in  Le Pin-au-Haras
 Individual winner:  Karim Florent Laghouag (with horse Punch de l'Esques)
 Team winners:  (Karim Florent Laghouag (with horse Punch de l'Esques), Clara Loiseau (with horse Wont Wait), Jean Teulère (with horse Voila d'Auzay), & Thais Meheust (with horse Quamilha))
 September 19 – 22: NCE #6 in  Waregem
 Individual winner:  Ingrid Klimke (with horse SAP Asha P)
 Team winners:  (Ingrid Klimke (with horse SAP Asha P), Andreas Dibowski (with horse FRH Butts Avedon), Andreas Ostholt (with horse Corvette 31), & Frank Ostholt (with horse Jum Jum))
 October 10 – 13: NCE #7 (final) in  Boekelo (Olympic Qualifier for 2020)
 Individual winner:  Laura Collett (with horse London 52)
 Team winners:  (Sandra Auffarth (with horse Let's Dance 73), Michael Jung (with horse Fischerrocana FRH), Ingrid Klimke (with horse SAP Asha P), & Anna Siemer (with horse Betel's Bella))

Horse racing

United States
US Triple Crown

 May 4: 2019 Kentucky Derby at  Churchill Downs
 Horse:  Country House; Jockey:  Flavien Prat; Trainer:  William I. Mott
 May 18: 2019 Preakness Stakes at  Pimlico
 Horse:  War of Will; Jockey:  Tyler Gaffalione; Trainer:  Mark E. Casse
 June 8: 2019 Belmont Stakes at  Belmont Park
 Horse:  Sir Winston; Jockey:  Joel Rosario; Trainer:  Mark E. Casse

Breeders' Cup

 November 1 & 2: 2019 Breeders' Cup at  Churchill Downs.

Other notable races
 January 26: 2019 Pegasus World Cup at  Gulfstream Park
 Horse:  City of Light; Jockey:  Javier Castellano; Trainer:  Michael McCarthy
 June 8: 2019 Metropolitan Handicap at  Belmont Park
 Horse:  Mitole; Jockey:  Ricardo Santana Jr.; Trainer:  Steven M. Asmussen
 TBA: 2019 Haskell Invitational Stakes at  Monmouth Park
 TBA: 2019 Arlington Million at  Arlington Park
 TBA: 2019 Pacific Classic Stakes at  Del Mar Racetrack
 TBA: 2019 Travers Stakes at  Saratoga Race Course
 TBA: 2019 Jockey Club Gold Cup at  Belmont Park

United Kingdom

British Classic Races
 May 4: 2019 2000 Guineas Stakes at  Newmarket
 Winner:  Magna Grecia (Jockey: Donnacha O'Brien, Trainer: Aidan O'Brien)
 May 5: 2019 1000 Guineas Stakes at  Newmarket
 Winner:  Hermosa (Jockey: Wayne Lordan, Trainer: Aidan O'Brien)
 May 31: 2019 Epsom Oaks at  Epsom
 Winner:  Anapurna (Jockey: Frankie Dettori, Trainer: John Gosden)
 June 1: 2019 Epsom Derby at  Epsom
 Winner:  Anthony Van Dyck (Jockey: Seamie Heffernan, Trainer: Aidan O'Brien)
 TBA: 2019 St Leger Stakes at  Doncaster

Other notable races
 TBA: 2019 King George VI and Queen Elizabeth Stakes at  Ascot
 TBA: 2019 International Stakes at  York
 TBA: 2019 British Champions Day at  Ascot

Ireland

Irish Classic Races
 May 25: 2019 Irish 2,000 Guineas at  Curragh
 Winner:  Phoenix of Spain (Jockey: Jamie Spencer, Trainer: Charles Hills)
 May 26: 2019 Irish 1,000 Guineas at  Curragh
 Winner:  Hermosa (Jockey: Ryan Moore, Trainer: Aidan O'Brien)
 June 29: 2019 Irish Derby at  Curragh
 Winner:  Sovereign (Jockey: Padraig Beggy, Trainer: Aidan O'Brien)
 TBA: 2019 Irish Oaks at  Curragh
 TBA: 2019 Irish St. Leger at  Curragh

Other notable races
 TBA: 2019 Irish Champion Stakes at  Leopardstown

France

French Classic Races
 May 12: 2019 Poule d'Essai des Pouliches (French 1,000 Guineas) at  Longchamp
 Winner:  Castle Lady (Jockey: Mickael Barzalona, Trainer: Henri-Alex Pantell)
 May 12: 2019 Poule d'Essai des Poulains (French 2,000 Guineas) at  Longchamp
 Winner:  Persian King (Jockey: Pierre-Charles Boudot, Trainer:  André Fabre)
 June 2: 2019 Prix du Jockey Club (French Derby) at  Chantilly
 Winner:  Sottsass (Jockey: Cristian Demuro, Trainer: Jean-Claude Rouget)
 June 16: 2019 Prix de Diane (French Oaks) at  Chantilly
 Winner:  Channel (Jockey: Pierre-Charles Boudot, Trainer: F-H Graffard)
 TBA: 2019 Grand Prix de Paris at  Longchamp
 TBA: 2019 Prix Royal-Oak (French St Leger) at  Longchamp

Other notable races
 June 30: 2019 Grand Prix de Saint-Cloud at  Saint-Cloud
 Winner:  Coronet (Jockey: Frankie Dettori, Trainer: John Gosden)
 TBA: 2019 Prix de l'Arc de Triomphe at  Longchamp

Australia

Australian Triple Crown
 March 9: 2019 Randwick Guineas at  Randwick
 Winner:  The Autumn Sun (Jockey: Kerrin McEvoy, Trainer: Chris Waller)
 March 23: 2019 Rosehill Guineas at  Rosehill
 Winner:  The Autumn Sun (Jockey: Kerrin McEvoy, Trainer: Chris Waller)
 April 6: 2019 Australian Derby at  Randwick
 Winner:  Angel of Truth (Jockey: Corey Brown, Trainer: Gwenda Markwell)

Other notable races
 April 13: 2019 Queen Elizabeth Stakes at  Randwick
 Winner:  Winx (Jockey: Hugh Bowman, Trainer: Chris Waller)
 October 19: 2019 Caulfield Cup at  Caulfield
 October 26: 2019 W. S. Cox Plate at  Moonee Valley
 November 5: 2019 Melbourne Cup at  Flemington

Canada

Canadian Triple Crown
 June 29: 2019 Queen's Plate at  Woodbine
 Winner:  One Bad Boy (Jockey: Flavien Prat, Trainer: Richard Baltas)
 July 23: 2019 Prince of Wales Stakes at  Fort Erie
 August 17: 2019 Breeders' Stakes at  Woodbine

Other notable races
 October 12: 2019 Canadian International Stakes at  Woodbine

Hong Kong

Hong Kong Triple Crown
 January 20: 2019 Hong Kong Stewards' Cup at  Sha Tin
 Winner:  Beauty Generation (Trainer: John Moore, Jockey: Zac Purton)
 February 17: 2019 Hong Kong Gold Cup at  Sha Tin
 Winner:  Exultant (Trainer: Anthony S. Cruz, Jockey: Zac Purton)
 May 26: 2019 Hong Kong Champions & Chater Cup at  Sha Tin

Other notable races
 April 28: 2019 Queen Elizabeth II Cup at  Sha Tin
 Winner:  Win Bright (Trainer: Yoshihiro Hatakeyama, Jockey: Masami Matsuoka)
 TBA: 2019 Hong Kong Cup at  Sha Tin

Other international horse racing events
 March 30: 2019 Dubai World Cup at  Meydan
 Winner:  Thunder Snow (Jockey: Christophe Soumillon, Trainer: Saeed bin Suroor)
 March 30: 2019 Dubai Sheema Classic at  Meydan
 Winner:  Old Persian (Jockey: William Buick, Trainer: Charlie Appleby)
 TBA: 2019 Japan Cup at  Tokyo

References

External links
 International Federation for Equestrian Sports – FEI – official website
 Inside FEI Website
 Longines Global Champions Tour & League Website
 Rolex Grand Slam of Show Jumping Website

 
Equestrian by year